Parikhara is a village in Hanumanganj Block in Ballia District of Uttar Pradesh State, India. It belongs to Azamgarh Division . It is located 2 km towards North from District headquarters Ballia. 3 km from Hanumanganj. About 400 km from State capital Lucknow.

Demographics

Parikhara Village is located 3 km to Ballia Railway Station. Parikhara is the first Village of Ballia.

History
 Parikhara is Ancient Village of Ballia District. 
 15 Colony in Parikhara.

Temples
 Shiv Temple (in Center)
 Gangaram Baba Aakhara (Gangaram Colony)
 Budhiya Kali Mai (Bhaiya Tola)
 Ramavat Dai (Adhiyara Tola)
 Kolkata Ke Kali Mai (Baba Angana)
 Mahavir Temple (East)

Education
 Govt. School
 Twinkle Public School
 Sant Sahajan Aadarsh Little Flower School
 Ballia Polytechnic (Govt.)

Medical
 Asharfi Hospital (East)

References

 Parikhara village
 Parikhara Ballia by Village in India
 Parikhara
 Parikhara Details by Wikiedit
 By India Mapped

Villages in Ballia district